Northfield station may refer to:

Northfield railway station in Birmingham, England
Northfield station (Waterloo), a light-rail station in Waterloo, Ontario, Canada
Northfield railway station, Adelaide, a former station in Adelaide, Australia

See also
Northfields tube station, a London Underground station